The Peter Bergmann case pertains to the mysterious death of an unidentified man in Sligo, County Sligo, Ireland, on or around 16 June 2009. The man, using the alias "Peter Bergmann", had checked into the Sligo City Hotel on 12 June, where he stayed during the majority of his visit to Sligo. The man's movements were captured on CCTV throughout the town; however, the details of his actions and intentions remain unknown. His interactions with other people were limited, and little is known of his origins or the reason for his visit.

On the morning of 16 June, the body of the unidentified man was discovered at Rosses Point beach, a popular recreation destination and fishing area near Sligo. Despite conducting a five-month investigation into his death, the Gardaí have never been able to identify the man or develop any leads in the case.

The mystery is often compared to the Tamam Shud case of Australia, in which an unidentified man was found dead on a beach shortly after the Second World War, although the Bergmann case has not achieved nearly the same amount of notoriety or international coverage. This case remains obscure to the public, and the official investigation has not extended to outside of Ireland.

The case received renewed attention in the 2010s. It was the subject of a 2013 documentary, The Last Days of Peter Bergmann, which was shown at the 2014 Sundance Film Festival and has developed a small following on social media websites such as Reddit, where readers have constructed theories of the case.

Arrival in Sligo
On Friday, 12 June, the man was first spotted at the Ulster Bus Depot in Derry between 14:30 and 16:00 local time (15:30 and 17:00 UTC). He boarded a bus headed to Sligo, County Sligo, carrying a black shoulder bag and a standard carry-on luggage bag. He arrived at 18:28 at Sligo bus station and took a taxi to the Sligo City Hotel, where he paid per night in cash. While checking in, he gave the false name of "Peter Bergmann" and an address that was later reported as "Ainstettersn 15, 4472, Vienna, Austria."  He had a slender build, stood  had short grey hair, blue eyes, a tan complexion, and appeared to be in his late 50s or early 60s. According to staff and tenants at the Sligo City Hotel, the man was of Germanic descent and spoke English with a thick German accent. He was neatly groomed; his face was shaven and his hair was clean and combed. The man was well dressed wearing a black leather jacket, blue trousers, socks, a black leather belt and a pair of black shoes (size 44). His clothes were from C&A, a popular fashion retail store in Europe with most of its stores in Germany and Austria. From the man's appearance it was assumed he was a professional worker. He was a frequent smoker and several surveillance videos show him smoking outside often.

During his stay at the hotel, the man was seen on CCTV footage leaving the building with a purple plastic bag full of items or personal effects. However, when he returned from his long walk he was no longer carrying the bag. It is presumed that he had disposed of his belongings throughout Sligo and then folded the bag and put it in his pocket. Authorities were unable to identify what he threw away in the public rubbish bins, as the man used the blind spots of the surveillance cameras to his advantage. His movements were very meticulous and methodical, as if he knew where to hide his personal belongings that could have identified him.

On Saturday, 13 June, the man was seen walking to Sligo post office at 10:49 (11:49 UTC) and purchased eight 82-cent stamps and airmail stickers. The following day, the man left the hotel between 11:00 and 11:30 (12:00 and 12:30 UTC) and asked a taxi driver recommendations for a nice quiet beach where he could swim. The taxi driver stated that Rosses Point would be the best place and proceeded to drive the unidentified man to the beach. The man returned with the same taxi and was dropped off at the bus station in Sligo.

Body discovery
On Monday, 15 June, the man checked out of the hotel at 13:06 (14:06 UTC) and handed in his room key. He left with a black shoulder bag, a purple plastic bag, and a different black luggage bag. He did not have the same black carry-on luggage bag he had when he first arrived in Sligo. He walked to the bus station via Quay Street and Wine Street, then stopped at Quayside Shopping Centre and awkwardly waited in the doorway for a number of minutes. At 13:16 (14:16 UTC) he left the shopping centre and walked along Wine Street in the direction of the bus station, still carrying all three bags. At 13:38 (14:38 UTC) he ordered a cappuccino and a toasted ham and cheese sandwich at the bus station. While eating his food, he looked at pieces of paper that he kept in his pocket. After reading the pieces of paper, he tore the paper in half and threw it away in a nearby rubbish bin. He then mounted a bus that departed at 14:20 (15:20 UTC) for Rosses Point. It was reported that he was seen by sixteen people while walking on the beach, casually greeting the passersby.

The following morning, Tuesday 16 June, Arthur Kinsella and his son Brian, who was training for a triathlon, found the man's body lying on the beach at 6:45 (7:45 UTC) in the morning. He was wearing purple striped Speedo-type swimming trunks, with his underpants over the top and a navy T-shirt tucked into them. Arthur and Brian said the Lord's Prayer for the man, and then called the Gardaí. At 8:10 (9:10 UTC), Dr Valerie McGowan officially pronounced the man dead. Following the discovery of the man's body, a five-month investigation into his identity was conducted by Gardaí.

Investigation
According to the post mortem report, the body of the man was found on Rosses Point beach with most of his clothes left behind on the shore, with no wallet, money or form of identification. Even though the man had been washed up on the beach, Sligo medical examiner Clive Kilgallen found no evidence of "classical salt water drowning", but also no signs of foul play that would give reason to believe the man's death was a homicide. The man's teeth were in good condition and showed signs of frequent dental work in his life. He had bridging, root canals, crowns and had a full gold tooth on the upper back right side of his mouth and a small silver filling along the gum of a tooth on the left side of the lower jaw.

Despite his well-groomed and dressed exterior, the man was in very poor health. The post mortem showed that he had advanced stages of prostate cancer and bone tumours. His heart showed signs of previous ischaemic heart disease. Notably for a man who had serious health conditions, the toxicology report stated that he had no medication of any sort in his system. The medical examiner noted that, due to the man's health status, he would have been in significant pain and would have required prescription pain medicine or at least over-the-counter pain relievers.

After a five-month investigation the body was buried in Sligo. The funeral was attended by four Gardaí.

Some sources say that during the police investigation following his death, it was discovered that the address he gave at the hotel belonged to a vacant lot. However, others have pointed out that a street with the reported spelling of "Ainstettersn" does not exist in Austria or Germany. Additionally, Vienna post codes begin with the number 1, rather than 4, and the post code 4472 is unassigned. It is unclear how police would have been able to establish that the fake address was tied to a vacant lot, or whether they simply determined that it did not exist. What is certain is that the man wanted to remain unknown and he pre-emptively planned his moves so that he could not be identified.

In 2015, the French newspaper Le Monde reported that they had contacted Austrian police about the case, and that Austrian police commented that the Gardaí had never contacted them. Le Monde also reported that there is no Interpol notice for the unidentified man because the body did not fall into either of the two Interpol categories for 'missing person' or 'wanted person'. It is the responsibility of the man's country of origin to report him as missing.

As of December 2022, the man is still unidentified. No relatives, friends, or witnesses have come forward, despite public appeals in Austrian and German newspapers. Although the Gardaí retain the man's DNA, a spokesperson said that DNA analysis could only narrow down the area the man might have been from, but not identify him.

See also
 Isdal Woman
 Joseph Newton Chandler III
 List of unsolved deaths
 Lori Erica Ruff
 Lyle Stevik
 Tamam Shud case

References

External links
 Mystery man's last surprise
 Last Days of Peter Bergmann
 German police website on the case
 Beach body unidentified
 Interpol list of missing persons

2009 deaths
2009 in the Republic of Ireland
Deaths by person in the Republic of Ireland
Unidentified decedents
Unsolved deaths